Gerald John Mordaunt (20 January 1873 – 5 March 1959), sometimes known as Gerry Mordaunt, was an English amateur cricketer who played first-class cricket for Oxford University, Kent County Cricket Club, the Marylebone Cricket Club (MCC), the Gentlemen and other amateur sides between 1893 and 1904.

Early life 
Mordaunt was born at Wellesbourne Hastings in Warwickshire and educated at Wellington College and University College, Oxford. He played cricket at both school and university, captaining the Wellington College side for three years. He was in the Oxford team for the University Match against Cambridge for four seasons from 1893 to 1896 and was captain in 1895, when his team included three future captains of the England national cricket team, Warner, C. B. Fry and H. D. G. Leveson Gower. As well as playing cricket, Mordaunt won the Public Schools Racquets Challenge Cup in 1891 and won an athletics blue in long jump in 1896.

Career 
Mordaunt played as a right-handed middle-order batsman and was described in his Wisden obituary as "free-scoring batsman, specially skilled in off-side strokes". He was also noted for his fielding: Pelham Warner in an obituary of him in The Times claimed that he may never have dropped a catch. He made a total of 60 appearances in first-class cricket matches, including 34 for Oxford and 16 for Kent and played in three Gentlemen v Players matches between 1894 and 1895. He was awarded his Kent county cap in 1895.

He toured North America with Lord Hawke's side in 1894, playing in both first-class matches against the Gentlemen of Philadelphia on the tour and in 1895 made his highest score of 264 not out. This came in a match against Sussex in which 1410 runs were scored, at the time a record for a three-day match, and was one of two centuries he scored in his first-class career.

Several members of Mordaunt's family also played first-class cricket. His brothers Henry and Eustace played for Middlesex and for other teams, his father, John Mordaunt, played for MCC and his grandson David Mordaunt was a Sussex and Minor Counties cricketer in the last days of amateurism in the 1950s.

Mordaunt was restricted by business commitments from playing county cricket more regularly. He died at Hayling Island in Hampshire in March 1959, at the age of 86.

References

External links

1873 births
1959 deaths
English cricketers
Oxford University cricketers
Gentlemen cricketers
Kent cricketers
Marylebone Cricket Club cricketers
I Zingari cricketers
People educated at Wellington College, Berkshire
Alumni of University College, Oxford
Gentlemen of England cricketers
Lord Hawke's XI cricketers